The Nunthorpe–Battersby Link was a short line connecting the Middlesbrough and Guisborough Railway and the now disused Picton-Battersby Line.

The line, which was opened in April 1868, ran from Nunthorpe Junction to Battersby. It remains in use today as part of the Esk Valley Line.

References

Rail transport in North Yorkshire
Railway lines opened in 1865